Goodsir is a surname. Notable people with the surname include:

Agnes Goodsir (1864–1939), Australian portrait painter
Harry Goodsir (1819-1848), Scottish physician and naturalist 
John Goodsir (1814–1867), Scottish anatomist
Joseph Taylor Goodsir (1815–1893), Scottish minister and theological author